The European Society for Paediatric Research (ESPR) is a professional association of neonatal and paediatric researchers comprising different sub-specialties. Together with its sister organisations, the American Pediatric Society (APS) and the Society for Pediatric Research (SPR), it publishes the peer-reviewed scientific journal Pediatric Research. The ESPR was founded in 1958.

Mission and vision 
The  ESPR  is  a  not-for-profit  organisation  and  aims  to  promote  paediatric  research  and  post-graduate  training  in  Europe.  It  encourages  collaboration  between  the  various specialised  fields  of  paediatrics,  with  the  goal  of  maintaining  paediatrics  as  a  unified,  scientifically-orientated discipline. The mission of the ESPR is to develop and apply research to improve newborn and child health. In this way, the society seeks to provide the foundation for a healthy population in Europe and beyond.

The Sections 
The ESPR is divided into nine sections and the European Board of Neonatology (EBN - the educational branch of the ESPR), representing different paediatric sub-specialties: Headed by dedicated and elected section secretaries, it is the sections' role:

 to provide speakers/topics for ESPR conferences;
 to publish research and guidelines related to their expertise;
 to act as a discussion forum and incubator of ideas/initiatives for like-minded Paediatric professionals;
 to organise annual gatherings at the ESRP congresses;
 to mentor young investigators.

The ESPR sections are:

 The European Board of Neonatology (EBN - formerly European Society of Neonatology, ESN)
 Brain and Development
Neonatal Resuscitation
 Nutrition, Metabolism and Gastroenterology
 Circulation, Haematology and Oxygen transport
 Epidemiology
 Pulmonology
 Paediatric and Neonatal Pharmacology
 Nursing and other Healthcare Professionals
 Infection, Inflammation and Immunology

The ESPR sections are open to all members of the society with a relevant specialisation.

Membership 
Membership to the ESPR is open to any professional who supports the aims of the society and has given at least one scientific contribution (e.g. presentation or poster) to one of the annual society meeting.

References

External links 
Official website

International medical associations of Europe
Pediatric organizations